is a Japanese pole vaulter. He competed at the 2009 World Championships without reaching the final. He is the 2010 Japanese Championships champion. His personal best jump is 5.55 metres, achieved in April 2008 and May 2009. The former was the Japanese university record at the time.

Personal bests

International competition

National title
Japanese Championships
Pole vault: 2010

References

External links

Takafumi Suzuki at JAAF 
Takafumi Suzuki at Mizuno Track Club  (archived)

1989 births
Living people
Sportspeople from Shizuoka Prefecture
Japanese male pole vaulters
World Athletics Championships athletes for Japan
Athletes (track and field) at the 2010 Asian Games
Competitors at the 2009 Summer Universiade
Japan Championships in Athletics winners
Asian Games competitors for Japan